Provincial city may refer to:
 Provincial city (Taiwan)
 Provincial city (Vietnam)
 Prefecture-level city in China